Pankaj Kumar may refer to:
Pankaj Kumar (cricketer), Indian cricketer
Pankaj Kumar (cinematographer), Indian cinematographer
Pankaj Kumar Rao, Indian cricketer